was a Japanese statesman, courtier and politician during the Heian period.

Career at court
He was a minister holding the title of daijō-daijin.

Genealogy
This member of the Fujiwara clan was the sixth son of Fujiwara no Fuyutsugu.  Among Yoshikada's brothers were Fujiwara no Yoshifusa, Fujiwara no Nagayoshi and Fujiwara no Yoshisuke.

Descendants of Yoshikado include, Fujiwara no Kanesuke, Fujiwara no Masatada, Fujiwara no Tametoki and Murasaki Shikibu.

His immediate decendants were two sons by the names of Fujiwara no Takafuji and Fujiwara no Toshimoto.

Yoshikada is considered the ancestor of the Uesugi clan, the Ii clan, and the Nichiren clan.

Notes

References
 Brinkley, Frank and Dairoku Kikuchi. (1915). A History of the Japanese People from the Earliest Times to the End of the Meiji Era. New York: Encyclopædia Britannica. OCLC 413099
 Nussbaum, Louis-Frédéric and Käthe Roth. (2005).  Japan encyclopedia. Cambridge: Harvard University Press. ;  OCLC 58053128
 Papinot, Edmund.. (1906) Dictionnaire d'histoire et de géographie du japon. Tokyo: Librarie Sansaisha.

Fujiwara clan
People of Heian-period Japan
9th-century Japanese people
Japanese politicians